Infinity Overhead is the fifth full-length album from Minus the Bear, released on August 28, 2012. It is their second album to be released on Dangerbird Records and was produced by the band's former keyboardist, Matt Bayles. The album was also released in the UK by Big Scary Monsters Recording Company in September.

It is their last album with drummer Erin Tate, who left the band in January 2015.

Track listing

Personnel

Minus the Bear
 Jake Snider - Lead vocals, Guitar
 Dave Knudson - Guitar, Omnichord
 Erin Tate - Drums
 Cory Murchy - Bass
 Alex Rose - Keyboards, Vocals, Saxophone

Production
 Produced by Matt Bayles and Minus The Bear
 Assisted by Derek Moree and Stephen Hogan
 Mastered by Bernie Grundman

References

Minus the Bear albums
2012 albums
Dangerbird Records albums